Trinity Journal is a biannual peer-reviewed academic journal.  It was established in 1980 and is published by Trinity Evangelical Divinity School.

External links 
 

Christianity studies journals
Publications established in 1980
Biannual journals
English-language journals